Ireland participated in the Junior Eurovision Song Contest 2017, which took place on 26 November 2017, in Tbilisi, Georgia. The Irish broadcaster TG4 is responsible for organising their entry for the contest through a national selection show entitled Junior Eurovision Éire. The national final took place on 19 November 2017, while the semifinals took place between 22 October and 12 November. This was Ireland's third appearance at the Junior Eurovision Song Contest.

Background

TG4 previously attempted to participate at the Junior Eurovision Song Contest 2014, but required funding from the Broadcasting Authority of Ireland (BAI), which was rejected.

Before Junior Eurovision
The Irish broadcaster was included in the final list of participants of the EBU, which revealed that they would be participating at Junior Eurovision for the third time in their history. The mechanism for selecting their entrant and song was through the national selection show Junior Eurovision Éire, like in their two other appearances. The selection process is scheduled to take place every Sunday starting on 22 October, where thirty-two participants competed, and culminated into a final which took place on 19 November 2017.

Jury members
TG4 published details on the names of the professional jury who would determine the winner of the Junior Eurovision Éire 2017 and the representative for Ireland at the 2017 contest in November. They had all represented Ireland in the Eurovision Song Contest at least once in their careers.

The judging panel consisted of Fiachna Ó Braonáin and Bláthnaid Tracey, as well as a different guest judge each week.

Junior Eurovision Éire

Semi Final 1
The first semi final took place on 22 October 2017, in which Brendan Murray and Dustin the Turkey were the guest judges.

Muireann McDonnell and Judy Langan both advanced to the final duel stage and performed their songs for the second time. After their second performances, the jury members selected Muireann McDonnell as the winner of semifinal 1 and advanced to the grand final on 19 November 2017. Judy Langan who lost the final duel received one of the two wildcards and advanced the final on 19 November 2017.

Semi Final 2 
The second semi final took place on 29 October 2017, in which Jedward were the guest judges.

Gwanaelle Noval and Aoife Goodson both advanced to the final duel stage and performed their songs for the second time. After their second performances, the jury members selected Gwanaelle Noval as the winner of semifinal 2 and advanced to the grand final on 19 November 2017. Mini Mix who was eliminated in Semi Final 2 but received one of the 2 Wildcards and proceeded to the Final.

Semi Final 3 
The second semi final took place on 5 November 2017, in which Dustin the Turkey and Brian Kennedy were the guest judges.

Úna Ní Mhistéil and Holly Owens both advanced to the final duel stage and performed their songs for the second time. After their second performances, the jury members selected Úna Ní Mhistéil as the winner of semifinal 3 and advanced to the grand final on 19 November 2017.

Semi Final 4 
The second semi final took place on 12 November 2017, in which Niamh Kavanagh was the guest judge.

Sinéad Carr  and Orla McDermott both advanced to the final duel stage and performed their songs for the second time. After their second performances, the jury members selected Sinéad Carr as the winner of semifinal 4 and advanced to the grand final on 19 November 2017.

Final
The grand final took place on 19 November 2017, in which Linda Martin was the guest judge.

Final Duel 

For the final, a sing-off was introduced between the top two contenders.

Gwenaelle Noval and Muireann McDonnell were chosen by the judging panel to advance to the final duel. Muireann received the majority of votes from the panel and was awarded the Irish ticket to Tbilisi.

At Junior Eurovision
During the opening ceremony and the running order draw which took place on 20 November 2017, Ireland was drawn to perform seventh on 26 November 2017, following Portugal and preceding Macedonia.

Voting

Detailed voting results

References

Junior Eurovision Song Contest
Ireland
2017